Camden County is a county located in the southeastern corner of the U.S. state of Georgia. According to the 2020 Census, its population was 54,768. Its county seat is Woodbine, and the largest city is St. Marys. It is one of the original counties of Georgia, created February 5, 1777. It is the 11th-largest county in the state of Georgia by area, and the 41st-largest by population.

Camden County comprises the St. Marys, GA micropolitan statistical area, which is included in the Jacksonville-St. Marys-Palatka, FL-GA combined statistical area.

History

The colonial period
The first recorded European to visit what is today Camden County was Captain Jean Ribault of France in 1562. Ribault was sent out by French Huguenots to find a suitable place for a settlement. Ribault named the rivers he saw the Seine and the Some, known today as the St. Marys and Satilla Rivers. Ribault described the area as, "Fairest, fruitfulest and pleasantest of all the world."

In 1565, Spain became alarmed by the French settlements and sent out a large force to take over and settle the area. During that time, the Spaniards attempted to convert the Native Americans to Catholicism. At least two missions operated on Cumberland Island, ministering to the Timucuan people, who had resided on the island for at least 4000 years.

Competing British and Spanish claims to the territory between their respective colonies of South Carolina and Florida was a source of international tension, and the colony of Georgia was founded in 1733 in part to protect the British interests. The Spanish theoretically lost their claim to the territory in 1742 after the Battle of Bloody Marsh (on St. Simons Island). However, settlement south of the Altamaha River (what is now Glynn and Camden Counties) was discouraged by both the British and Spanish governments. One group of settlers led by Edmund Gray sparked Spanish military action after settling on the Satilla River in the 1750s near present-day Burnt Fort, and were subsequently disbanded by the Royal Governor John Reynolds.

General Oglethorpe was at Cumberland Island when Tomochichi gave the barrier island its name. Later, he erected a hunting lodge on Cumberland named Dungeness, which was the predecessor of the famous Greene and Carnegie Dungeness Mansions. He also founded Fort St. Andrews on the north end of Cumberland Island, as well as a strong battery, Fort Prince Williams, on the south end. Fort Prince Williams commanded the entrance to the St. Marys River, but had become a ruin by the Revolutionary War.

In 1763, Spain, under a treaty of peace with Great Britain, ceded Florida to the British. After this, the boundaries of Georgia were extended from the Altamaha (now the southern boundary of McIntosh County) to the St. Marys River (the current southern boundary of Camden). In 1765, four parishes were laid out between the Altamaha and St. Marys Rivers. These were St. Davids, St. Patricks, St. James, and the parishes of St. Marys and St. Thomas.

The early American era
Largely due to security issues arising from proximity to powerful Indian groups and British Florida, Georgia was the last colony to join in the War for Independence in 1775. In the Georgia Constitution of 1777 St. Thomas and St. Marys Parishes were formed into Camden County, named for Charles Pratt, 1st Earl Camden in England, a supporter of American independence. Originally Camden County was larger and also included parts of present-day Ware, Brantley, and Charlton Counties, which were re-designated in the nineteenth century.

Also under the 1777 state constitution, Glynn County and Camden County had limited and restricted representation in the new patriotic Georgia government due to their extreme "state of alarm" throughout the war. Between 1776 and 1778 Camden County saw the construction of numerous forts, three failed American campaigns against the British at St. Augustine, and numerous depredations by raiders of various allegiance. One of the most notorious of these raiders was Daniel McGirth. A significant loyalist faction existed in Camden County, headed by the brothers of Royal Governor James Wright, Charles and German Wright. They built a fort on the St. Marys River in 1775 to protect their lands and chattel during the war after repeated attacks by patriot banditti. Wright's Fort became a rendezvous for a group of loyalists called the "Florida Rangers". Two skirmishes were fought by Loyalist and Continental forces over Wright's Fort, and both times American troops failed to rout the Loyalists from the area. Finally, retreating British soldiers burned it down in 1778. The Americans rebuilt it when they invaded East Florida, and then burned it down to prevent it falling into enemy hands. The archaeological site was rediscovered in 1975.

The primary economic enterprise of the county was rice planting, particularly along the Satilla River. Sea Island cotton was grown on Cumberland Island, and short-staple cotton was grown on the mainland along with sugar cane. Various forest products including turpentine and timber were produced, mainly for consumption in the naval industry and the West Indies. Camden County also served as a hub of backcountry trade with American settlers and various Indian groups, and as a shipyard and shipping center centered around the town of St. Marys. The land in Camden County was owned by fewer than 300 people throughout the colonial and antebellum eras. Most of the white population worked in trades or as tenant farmers, while nearly all black residents were slaves. Until the 1840s (and increasingly strict black codes), Camden County had a small population of free black workers, mainly involved in day labor or maritime industry.

Camden County was the site of many trading posts with the Native Americans, who by the late eighteenth and early nineteenth centuries consisted mainly of people of the Creek Nation. From America's earliest years and even after Indian Removal in the 1830s, the county was a site of significant conflict between settlers and Indians, leading to a small series of local Indian wars, and displacement of both Indian and local American refugees. An important step towards establishing boundaries in the Early Federal period came with the Treaty of Colerain which was signed on June 29, 1796 on the St. Marys between United States agents and the Creeks.

Many men from Camden County volunteered to fight under John Houstoun McIntosh, a wealthy landowner in the region, during the Patriot War in Florida in 1811. These men would go on to help capture the town of Fernandina, Florida. 

On January 15, 1815, British troops led by Sir George Cockburn landed on Cumberland Island. Their goal was to attack the fort at Point Peter. They quickly overwhelmed the small American forced and took Ft. Point Peter easily. After the skirmish, British soldiers occupied the county through February. They raided the town of St. Marys, as well as many plantations and smaller settlements. Although New Orleans was the last major battle of the war, the skirmish at Point Peter happened even later, almost a month after the Treaty of Ghent had been signed. The British occupation of Camden County led to the liberation of an estimated 1,485 slaves from Georgia and Florida.

Camden County was on an international border until the Adams–Onís Treaty of 1819 between the United States and Spain, making the Florida provinces American territory.

The Civil War and Reconstruction
At the beginning of the Civil War, the population was 5,482 of which 1,721 were white. During the war, many of the county's civilians moved farther inland, particularly to Centerville and Trader's Hill on the St. Marys River in Charlton County. The inhabitant's fears were realized when the town of St. Marys was attacked by United States Navy. At least one federal party to "carry off" slaves was met by armed resistance on White Oak Creek off the Satilla River.

Camden County organized four volunteer companies: the Camden Chasseurs, St. Marys Volunteers Guard, Camden Rifles, and Camden County Guards.

Camden County land fell under Sherman's Special Field Order No. 15. which dictated the distribution of parcels of land to freedmen. However, by 1868 Camden County's freedmen found themselves dispossessed of land they had lived and worked on since emancipation or earlier. Confiscated lands were returned to former landowners. During the first years of Reconstruction, Republican candidates and many local blacks were able to gain political victories. The first Democratic victory in the county after the war went to Ray Tompkins. This signaled a return to a white political majority and the end of the Reconstruction Era concurrent with the statewide Democratic victory in 1870.

Modern
Earlier plans for railways in the area dated back to the 1830s, but construction was never begun. In 1893, Florida Central and Peninsular Railroad built a Savannah-Jacksonville line through Camden County.  In 1923 the county seat of Camden County was moved from St. Marys to Woodbine, a reflection of the shift from the water transportation to railways. In 1927 U.S. Route 17 was constructed through Woodbine and Kingsland.

From 1917 to 1937 a pogy plant producing oil for Procter & Gamble and fertilizer for the Southern Fertilizer and Chemical Company was one of the major economic activities of the area. The layoffs from the pogy plant found relief when the Gilman Paper Company came to the county in 1939. The company was sold to Durango Paper Co. in 1999, and went out of business in 2002, resulting in 900 workers losing their jobs.

In 1965, Thiokol Chemical launched a -diameter, -thrust rocket from their chemical plant in the eastern part of the county.
On February 3, 1971, a fire and explosion occurred at the plant, located 12 miles southeast of Woodbine. The industrial accident killed 29 workers and seriously injured 50 others.

During World War II, the Georgia State Guard and local Home Guard held bases on Cumberland Island. The island and surrounding waters were also patrolled by the United States Coast Guard. The U.S. Army began to acquire land south of Crooked River in 1954 to build a military ocean terminal to ship ammunition in case of a national emergency.
In November 1976 the area of Kings Bay was selected for a submarine base. Soon afterward, the first Navy personnel arrived in the Kings Bay area and started preparations for the orderly transfer of property from the Army to the Navy. Naval Submarine Base Kings Bay not only occupies the former Army terminal land, but several thousand additional acres. Camden County's population grew enormously after the military took an interest in the area, and during the 1980s was the fourth fastest growing county in the United States.

Cumberland Island National Seashore was established in 1970 to protect and preserve the natural and historic resources of the island. Crooked River State Park was established in 1985.

In 2009 the Camden County Sheriff's Office was ordered by the Justice Department to repay $662,000 of improperly spent funds seized from alleged criminals before it would be allowed to participate in the Justice Department's equitable sharing program. Items that were determined to have been purchased by the Camden County Sheriff's Department improperly included a Dodge Viper purchased for approximately $90,000 which the Sheriff's Office intended to use in anti-drug programs. 

In 2012, the Camden County Joint Development Authority began considering developing a spaceport for both horizontal and vertical spacecraft operations.  Options included moving the St. Marys' airport to the Atlantic coastal site
which had previously been used for a rocket launch in 1965.
, the County was investigating options to purchase  of land from landowners who own the land formerly occupied by Thiokol Chemical and Bayer CropScience at Harrietts Bluff.  If an agreement is reached with landowners, then another 18-month-long environmental impact process could begin on the larger parcel of land.  Georgia state legislators would likely offer tax incentives for commercial development in the project.  If development were to proceed, the earliest launch possible would have been in 2018, according to the 2014 projections.

In June 2015, the Camden board decided to formally advance the Spaceport Camden project by initiating an FAA Environmental Impact Assessment of the 4000+ acre facility.

Geography

The bulk of Camden County's central and western area, from an east–west line running through Waverly in the north to a line running from Folkston northeast to St. Andrew Sound, is located in the Satilla River sub-basin of the St. Marys-Satilla basin. The area north of Waverly, as well as from west of Kingsland east to the coast of Cumberland Island, is located in the Cumberland-St. Simons sub-basin of the St. Marys-Satilla River basin. Camden County's southern border area, in a line from Folkston to St. Marys, is located in the St. Marys River sub-basin of the same St. Marys-Satilla basin.

The 1898 Georgia hurricane which made landfall on Cumberland Island in Camden County was the strongest hurricane to hit the state of Georgia within recorded history.

Major highways

  Interstate 95
  U.S. Route 17
  State Route 25
  State Route 25 Spur
  State Route 40
  State Route 40 Spur
  State Route 110
  State Route 252
  State Route 405 (unsigned designation for I-95)

Adjacent counties
 Glynn County (north)
 Nassau County, Florida (south)
 Charlton County (southwest)
 Brantley County (northwest)

National protected area
 Cumberland Island National Seashore

Demographics

2000 census
As of the census of 2000, there were 43,664 people, 14,705 households, and 11,381 families residing in the county.  The population density was 69 people per square mile (27/km2).  There were 16,958 housing units at an average density of 27 per square mile (10/km2).  The racial makeup of the county was 75.04% White, 20.11% Black or African American, 0.49% Native American, 1.01% Asian, 0.08% Pacific Islander, 1.37% from other races, and 1.88% from two or more races.  3.63% of the population were Hispanic or Latino of any race.

There were 14,705 households, out of which 46.80% had children under the age of 18 living with them, 62.20% were married couples living together, 11.70% had a female householder with no husband present, and 22.60% were non-families. 17.70% of all households were made up of individuals, and 4.00% had someone living alone who was 65 years of age or older.  The average household size was 2.84 and the average family size was 3.22.

According to the 2000 Census the largest reported European ancestry groups in Camden County were: English (15.1%), German (12.7%) and Irish (10.4%).

In the county, the population was spread out, with 31.70% under the age of 18, 12.90% from 18 to 24, 33.90% from 25 to 44, 16.30% from 45 to 64, and 5.20% who were 65 years of age or older.  The median age was 28 years. For every 100 females there were 107.00 males.  For every 100 females age 18 and over, there were 108.50 males.

The median income for a household in the county was $41,056, and the median income for a family was $45,005. Males had a median income of $31,582 versus $22,104 for females. The per capita income for the county was $16,445.  About 8.40% of families and 10.10% of the population were below the poverty line, including 11.30% of those under age 18 and 15.70% of those age 65 or over.

2010 census
As of the 2010 United States Census, there were 50,513 people, 18,047 households, and 13,468 families residing in the county. The racial makeup of the county was 74.4% white, 19.4% black or African American, 1.4% Asian, 0.5% American Indian, 0.2% Pacific islander, 1.1% from other races, and 3.0% from two or more races. Those of Hispanic or Latino origin made up 5.1% of the population. In terms of ancestry, 12.3% were German, 10.5% were Irish, 9.1% were English, and 7.1% were American.

Of the 18,047 households, 40.8% had children under the age of 18 living with them, 55.8% were married couples living together, 14.3% had a female householder with no husband present, 25.4% were non-families, and 20.1% of all households were made up of individuals. The average household size was 2.69 and the average family size was 3.09. The median age was 31.3 years.

The median income for a household in the county was $49,230 and the median income for a family was $57,366. Males had a median income of $41,753 versus $30,368 for females. The per capita income for the county was $22,022. About 12.6% of families and 15.3% of the population were below the poverty line, including 20.2% of those under age 18 and 15.4% of those age 65 or over.

2020 census

As of the 2020 United States census, there were 54,768 people, 19,338 households, and 14,380 families residing in the county.

Education

Camden is home to one comprehensive public high school (with a separate center for ninth graders), two middle schools, nine elementary schools and an alternative school. The system serves approximately 9,600 students. The school board is run by the following members:
 Superintendent of Schools - Dr. Will Hardin
 Assistant Superintendent - Dr. Jonathan Miller
 Assistant Superintendent - Dr. Rebecca Gillette

Camden County High School is the single public high school in Camden County, offering a comprehensive curriculum (9–12) with a variety of classes for both College Preparatory and Career Technology Preparatory. The high school campus is one of the largest in the state of Georgia.  It consists of a main building (10-12 building) as well as a ninth grade center that holds two additional hallways, one gymnasium, one cafeteria, and one media center.  The school has also recently constructed an additional building consisting of classrooms, conference rooms, and a large weight room. The school offers AP classes and joint-enrollment with College of Coastal Georgia and the Valdosta State University Kings Bay Campus.  The school is part of the Georgia High School Association and is classified as a "AAAAAAA" or "7A" school in Region 1.  In 2003, the Wildcats won the Georgia 5A Football State Championship by defeating Valdosta High School.  In 2008, the Wildcats won their second 5A State Football Championship by defeating Peachtree Ridge High School. In 2009, the Wildcats won their third 5A State Football Championship by defeating Northside (Warner Robins).

Communities

Cities
 Kingsland
 St. Marys
 Woodbine

Census-designated place
 Kings Bay Base

Unincorporated communities
 Dover Bluff
 Hopewell
 Spring Bluff
 Waverly
 White Oak
 Bullhead Bluff

Historic communities
 Trader's Hill

Politics

Notable people
 James Seagrove: appointed Creek Indian Agent by the federal government and Superintendent of Creek Indian Affairs in 1789. Also a local trader associated with Trader's Hill and founder of St. Marys.
 Duncan Lamont Clinch: After serving in the Seminole Wars, partially in Camden County, Clinch retired to planting near Jefferson on the Satilla River, and later began his political career.
 Thomas Buckingham Smith: Born on Cumberland Island in 1810, Smith was a diplomat, antiquarian, and scholar. Notable Spanish translator and author of works on southern Native Americans.
 John Floyd (October 3, 1769 – June 24, 1839): was an American politician and brigadier general in the First Brigade of Georgia Militia. He was a member of the Georgia House of Representatives, as well as the US House of Representatives.
 Charles Rinaldo Floyd (1797-1845): led the first U.S. campaign into the Okefenoke Swamp during the Seminole Wars. The Floyds were the largest planting family in Camden County.
 Catherine Littlefield Greene: Wife of General Nathaniel Greene. Lived on Cumberland Island and built the county's largest antebellum home, Dungeness.
 Travis Taylor: American former college and professional football player who was a wide receiver in the National Football league (NFL) for eight seasons during the 2000s. Taylor played college football for the University of Florida. A first-round pick in the 2000 NFL Draft, he played professionally for the Baltimore Ravens, Minnesota Vikings, Oakland Raiders and St. Louis Rams.
 Stump Mitchell: American football coach and former professional player. He served as head football coach at Morgan State University from 1996 to 1998 and Southern University from 2010 to 2012, compiling an overall college football record of 14–42. Mitchell played collegiately at The Citadel and thereafter was drafted by the St. Louis Cardinals of the National Football League (NFL). He was a running back and return specialist for the Cardinals from 1981 to 1989.
 Ryan Seymour:  American football offensive guard for the New York Giants of the National Football League (NFL). He was drafted by the Seattle Seahawks in the seventh round of the 2013 NFL Draft, and has also played for the San Francisco 49ers and Cleveland Browns. He played college football for Vanderbilt.
 Alicia Patterson: Founder and editor of Newsday. While not from Camden County by birth, her remains are interred at her private hunting lodge in Kingsland.
 Jarrad Davis: Former linebacker for the Camden County Wildcats, the University of Florida, and current linebacker for the Detroit Lions
 Jason Spencer: former State Representative for district 180 in the Georgia House of Representatives from 2011–2018, is a longtime resident of the center of the district, Woodbine.
William J. Hardee, Confederate general

See also

 National Register of Historic Places listings in Camden County, Georgia

References

External links

 Camden County website
 "Camden County" New Georgia Encyclopedia 

 
Georgia (U.S. state) counties
1777 establishments in Georgia (U.S. state)
Populated places established in 1777